The 1957 Polish Speedway season was the 1957 season of motorcycle speedway in Poland.

Individual

Polish Individual Speedway Championship
The 1957 Individual Speedway Polish Championship format changed from multiple legs to a one of final, held on 18 August at Rybnik.

Team

Team Speedway Polish Championship
The 1957 Team Speedway Polish Championship was the tenth edition of the Team Polish Championship.

In First and Second League, matches were played with part two teams, with it playing it matches return.  It made up the team six riders plus two reserve. The score of heat: 3-2-1-0. Mecz consisted with 13 heats.  For winning game team received 2 points, draw - 1 point, lost - 0 points. The riders from main squad started in match four times. The quantity of small points was added up.

In Third League, matches were played with part two teams, with it playing it matches return. It made up the team six riders plus two reserve. The score of heat: 3-2-1-0. Mecz consisted with 9 heats. For winning game team received 2 points, draw - 1 point, lost - 0 points. The riders from main squad started in match three times. The quantity of small points was added up.

First League 

Medalists

Second League

Third League

References

Poland Individual
Poland Team
Speedway